Neil Adam Gershenfeld (born December 1, 1959) is an American professor at MIT and the director of MIT's Center for Bits and Atoms, a sister lab to the MIT Media Lab. His research studies are predominantly focused in interdisciplinary studies involving physics and computer science, in such fields as quantum computing, nanotechnology, and personal fabrication. Gershenfeld attended Swarthmore College, where he graduated in 1981 with a B.A. degree in physics with high honors, and Cornell University, where he earned his Ph.D.in physics in 1990. He is a Fellow of the American Physical Society. Scientific American has named Gershenfeld one of their "Scientific American 50" for 2004 and has also named him Communications Research Leader of the Year. Gershenfeld is also known for releasing the Great Invention Kit in 2008, a construction set that users can manipulate to create various objects.

Gershenfeld has been featured in a variety of newspapers and magazines such as The New York Times and The Economist, and on NPR.
He was named as one of the 40 modern-day Leonardos by the Museum of Science and Industry Chicago. Prospect named him as one of the top 100 public intellectuals.

Teaching career

In 1998, Gershenfeld started a class at MIT called "How to make (almost) anything". Gershenfeld wanted to introduce expensive, industrial-size machines to the technical students. However, this class attracted a lot of students from various backgrounds: artists, architects, designers, students without any technical background. In his interview to CNN, Gershenfeld said that "the students... were answering a question I didn't ask, which is: What is this stuff good for? And the answer is: Not to make what you can buy in stores, but to make what you can't buy in stores. It's to personalise fabrication". Gershenfeld believes that this is the beginning of a new revolution: digital revolution in fabrication that will allow people to fabricate things, machines on demand.

Gershenfeld has presented his course on "How to make (almost) anything" at the Association of Professional Model Makers (APMM) 2010 Conference.

This class later has led Gershenfeld to create Fab lab in collaboration with Bakhtiar Mikhak at MIT. Gershenfeld feels very passionate about this project, as he believes that teaching kids how to use technology and create it themselves will empower the future generations to become more independent and create technology that each individual community needs, not a technology that is currently available on the market. Fab labs have spread around the world, having been established in the remotest of places and countries. In his interview with Discover magazine on the question what personal fabrication might be useful for, Gershenfeld said, "There is a surprising need for emergent technologies in many of the least developed places on the planet. While our needs might be fairly well met, there are billions of people on the planet whose needs are not. Their problems don't need incremental tweaks in current technology, but a revolution".

As well as "How to make (almost) anything" class, Gershenfeld has started teaching the following classes: "How To Make Something That Makes (almost) Anything", "The Physics of Information Technology", "The Nature of Mathematical Modeling".

Gershenfeld has been a keynote speaker at the Congress of Science and Technology Leaders (2015, 2016).

Research

Neil Gershenfeld and his students have done an extensive amount of research. His research was published in Science as well as in The American Physical Society journal. Amongst many is the research on Experimental Implementation of Fast Quantum Searching, Microfluidic Bubble Logic research, Physical one-way functions.

Bibliography
 ; 
 ;  (hbk)
  
  
  ebook

References

External links
 
 Center for Bits and Atoms at MIT
 Science magazine website
 American Physical Society website
 Fab Foundation website
 

Living people
21st-century American physicists
Harvard Fellows
Massachusetts Institute of Technology faculty
Cornell University alumni
Swarthmore College alumni
MIT Media Lab people
Quantum information scientists
1959 births
Fellows of the American Physical Society